Geraldyn M. Cobb  (March 5, 1931 – March 18, 2019), commonly known as Jerrie Cobb, was an American aviator. She was also part of the Mercury 13, a group of women who underwent physiological screening tests at the same time as the original Mercury Seven astronauts. She was the first to complete each of the tests.

Early life 
Born on March 5, 1931, in Norman, Oklahoma, Cobb was the daughter of Lt. Col. William H. Cobb and Helena Butler Stone Cobb. From birth, Cobb was on the move as is the case for many children of military families. Weeks after being born Cobb's family moved to Washington, D.C., where her grandfather, Ulysses Stevens Stone, was serving in the United States House of Representatives. After Ulysses Stone lost a reelection bid, the family moved back to Oklahoma where he and Cobb's father worked as automobile salesmen. Once the United States became involved in World War II Cobb's family moved once again, this time to Wichita Falls, Texas where Cobb's father joined his active U.S. National Guard unit. The family would move again to Denver, Colorado before finally returning to Oklahoma after World War II where Cobb spent the majority of her childhood.

As a child growing up in Oklahoma, Cobb took to aviation at an early age, with her pilot father's encouragement.  Cobb first flew in an aircraft at age twelve, in her father's open cockpit 1936 Waco biplane.  At 16, she was barnstorming around the Great Plains in a Piper J-3 Cub, dropping leaflets over little towns announcing the arrival of circuses. Sleeping under the Cub's wing at night, she helped scrape together money for fuel to practice her flying by giving rides. By the age of 17, while a student at Oklahoma City Classen High School, Cobb had earned her private pilot's license. She received her commercial pilots license a year later. In 1948, Cobb attended Oklahoma College for Women for a year.

Career 
She gained her Private Pilot's license at the age of 17 and her Commercial Pilot's license on her 18th birthday. Facing sex discrimination and the return of many qualified male pilots after World War II, she took on less-sought-after flying jobs, such as patrolling pipelines and crop dusting. She went on to earn her Multi-Engine, Instrument, Flight Instructor, and Ground Instructor ratings as well as her Airline Transport license. At the age of 21 she was delivering military fighters and four-engine bombers to foreign Air Forces worldwide.

When Cobb became the first woman to fly in the Paris Air Show, the world's largest air exposition, her fellow airmen named her Pilot of the Year and awarded her the Amelia Earhart Gold Medal of Achievement. Life Magazine named her one of the nine women of the "100 most important young people in the United States".

To save the money to buy a surplus World War II Fairchild PT-23 to allow her to be self-employed, Cobb played women's softball on a semiprofessional team, the Oklahoma City Queens.

By 1959, at age 28, Cobb was a pilot and manager for Aero Design and Engineering Company, which also made the Aero Commander aircraft she used in her record-making feats, and she was one of the few women executives in aviation. By 1960 she had 7,000 hours of flying time.

In November 1960, following multiple crashes of the Lockheed L-188 Electra, American Airlines' marketing department identified that the aircraft's reputation was poor among women, impacting passenger bookings. At the time American Airlines had no female pilots. In an attempt to win over passengers, the airline invited Cobb to fly the aircraft on a highly publicized four-hour test. It was her first turboprop flight.

In May 1961 NASA Administrator James Webb appointed Cobb as a consultant to the NASA space program.

Medical testing 

Although Cobb successfully completed all three stages of physical and psychological evaluation that were used in choosing the first seven Mercury astronauts, this was not an official NASA program, and she was unable to rally support in Congress for adding women to the astronaut program. At the time, Cobb had flown 64 types of propeller aircraft, but had made only one flight, in the back seat, of a jet fighter. As a NASA historian wrote:

In 1962, Cobb was called to testify before a Congressional hearing, the Special Subcommittee on the Selection of Astronauts, about women astronauts. Astronaut John Glenn stated at the hearing that "men go off and fight the wars and fly the airplanes", and "the fact that women are not in this field is a fact of our social order". Only a few months later, the Soviet Union would send the first woman into space, Valentina Tereshkova. Soon afterward, Tereshkova ridiculed Cobb for her religious beliefs but sympathized with the sexism she encountered: "They (American leaders) shout at every turn about their democracy and at the same time they announce they will not let a woman into space. This is open inequality."

Cobb lobbied, along with other Mercury 13 participants, including Jane Briggs Hart, to be allowed to train alongside the men. At the time, however, NASA requirements for entry into the astronaut program were that the applicant be a military test pilot, experienced at high-speed military test flying, and have an engineering background, enabling them to take over controls in the event it became necessary. Since all military test pilots were men at the time, this effectively excluded women. Liz Carpenter, the Executive Assistant to Vice President Lyndon Johnson, drafted a letter to NASA administrator James E. Webb questioning these requirements, but Johnson did not send the letter, instead writing across it: "Let's stop this now!"

Later life and death 
Cobb then began over 30 years of missionary work in South America, performing humanitarian flying (e.g., transporting supplies to indigenous tribes), as well as surveying new air routes to remote areas. Cobb "pioneered new air routes across the hazardous Andes Mountains and Amazon rain forests, using self-drawn maps that guided her over uncharted territory larger than the United States". Cobb has been honored by the Brazilian, Colombian, Ecuadorian, French, and Peruvian governments. In 1981, she was nominated for the Nobel Peace Prize for her humanitarian work.

In 1999, the National Organization for Women conducted an unsuccessful campaign to send Cobb to space to investigate the effects of aging, as John Glenn had been. John Glenn's main purpose on his space flight was to observe the effects of a micro-gravity environment on the body of an aged individual. Specifically, NASA wanted to observe whether the effects of weightlessness had positive consequences on the balance, metabolism, blood flow, and other bodily functions of an elderly person. Cobb believed that it was necessary to also send an aged woman on a space flight in order to determine whether the same effects witnessed on men would be witnessed on women. At 67, Cobb, and who had passed the same tests as John Glenn, petitioned NASA for the chance to participate in such a space flight, but NASA stated "it had no plans to involve additional senior citizens in upcoming launches". Many aviators and astronauts of the time believed this was a failed chance for NASA to right a wrong they had made years before. Cobb never reached her ultimate goal of space flight.

Cobb received numerous aviation honors, including the Harmon Trophy and the Fédération Aéronautique Internationale's Gold Wings Award.

On March 18, 2019, thirteen days after her 88th birthday, Cobb died at her home in Florida.

In popular culture
Laurel Ollstein's 2017 play They Promised Her the Moon (revised in 2019) tells the story of Jerrie Cobb and her struggle to become an astronaut.

Sonya Walger portrays the character Molly Cobb, based on Jerrie Cobb, in the 2019 alternate history TV series For All Mankind, in which Cobb becomes the first American woman in space. Episode four of the first season, "Prime Crew", is dedicated to her memory.

Cobb is portrayed by Mamie Gummer in the 2020 Disney+ TV series The Right Stuff.

Awards
 Amelia Earhart Gold Medal of Achievement
 Named Woman of the Year in Aviation
 Named Pilot of the Year by the National Pilots Association
 Fourth American to be awarded Gold Wings of the Fédération Aéronautique Internationale, Paris, France, Europe
 Honored by the government of Ecuador for pioneering new air routes over the Andes Mountains and Andes jungle
 1962 Received the Golden Plate Award of the American Academy of Achievement
 1973 Awarded Harmon International Trophy for "The Worlds Best Woman Pilot" by President Richard Nixon at a White House ceremony.
 Inducted into the Oklahoma Hall of Fame as "the Most Outstanding Aviatrix in the US
 Received Pioneer Woman Award for her "courageous frontier spirit" flying all over the Amazon jungle serving primitive Indian tribes
 1979 Bishop Wright Air Industry Award for her "humanitarian contributions to modern aviation".
2000 Inducted into "Women in Aviation International Pioneer Hall of Fame".
 2007 Honorary Doctor of Science degree from University of Wisconsin–Oshkosh.
2012 Inducted into the National Aviation Hall of Fame.

Notes

References

External links 

 Lovelace's Woman In Space nasa.gov
 Encyclopedia of Oklahoma History and Culture - Cobb, Geraldyn M. "Jerrie"
 The Jerrie Cobb Foundation, Inc.
 http://www.mercury13.com/jerrie.htm 
 Had NASA believed in merit
 https://www.thoughtco.com/errie-cobb-3072207
 
 Jerrie Cobb papers, 1931-2012 MC 974; Vt-260; DVD-147. Schlesinger Library, Radcliffe Institute, Harvard University, Cambridge, Mass.

1931 births
2019 deaths
People from Norman, Oklahoma
Aviators from Oklahoma
Harmon Trophy winners
University of Science and Arts of Oklahoma alumni
American aviation record holders
Mercury 13
American women aviation record holders
Classen School of Advanced Studies alumni